Liao Chin-ming (born 29 January 1966) is a Taiwanese weightlifter. He competed in the men's heavyweight I event at the 1988 Summer Olympics.

References

1966 births
Living people
Taiwanese male weightlifters
Olympic weightlifters of Taiwan
Weightlifters at the 1988 Summer Olympics
Place of birth missing (living people)